The North American Aviation XA2J "Super Savage" was a prototype carrier-based attack aircraft built in the early 1950s. It was developed by North American Aviation (NAA) from the smaller AJ Savage.

Design and development

The XA2J was intended to be a turboprop-powered derivative of the AJ Savage, with the design as initially proposed in December 1947 a simple modification of the Savage, with extensive use of components of the earlier aircraft. The design gradually evolved, however, to improve performance and increase compatibility with operations from aircraft carriers, as it was recognized that the AJ Savage was deficient in performance and was a less-than-satisfactory carrier aircraft.

The A2J was essentially an enlarged AJ Savage with the two reciprocating engines replaced with two Allison T40 turboprop engines and removal of the tail-mounted turbojet. Like the AJ, it was a high-winged monoplane with unswept wings. The wings were fitted with leading edge slats and large trailing edge flaps, and folded outside of the engine nacelles to ease storage aboard ship. It had a crew of three: pilot, co-pilot/bombardier, and gunner who sat in a pressurised cabin in the nose of the aircraft.

Construction of two prototypes started 1 October 1948, but due to delays developing the engines, the first flight was not until 4 January 1952. The competing Douglas XA3D, the prototypes of which were ordered the year after construction had begun on the XA2J prototypes, first flew in October 1952. The A3D had far superior performance, which doomed the XA2J.

The root cause for the failure of the XA2J was the protracted development and poor reliability of the Allison T40 engines. The T40 engine was an ambitious engine design with two power sections, (the T38 was developed from the T40 to assist in its development, by using a single power section with extension shaft and gearbox), driving two large contra-rotating propellers through a combining gearbox. Both the engines and the gearbox proved to be unreliable. The T40 engine was also used in the developmental Douglas A2D Skyshark, and the Republic XF-84H Thunderscreech. After a number of engine-related mishaps, the XA2J project was abandoned and the second prototype was never flown.

Operators

United States Navy

Specifications (XA2J-1)

See also

References

Notes

Bibliography

External links

"Navy Gets Turboprop Bomber." Popular Science, April 1952, p. 141.

A2J
North American A2J
Aircraft with contra-rotating propellers
High-wing aircraft
Carrier-based aircraft
Cancelled military aircraft projects of the United States
Aircraft first flown in 1952
Twin-turboprop tractor aircraft